Hessle Rugby Union Football Club is an English Rugby Union team based in Hessle, East Riding of Yorkshire. The 1st XV currently play in Yorkshire 4.

History 

The exact date of formation is unknown however the earliest records come from a newspaper article documenting Hessle's loss to Hull Kingston Rovers in 1886.

Hessle reached their highest level of play in 2009/2010 playing in Yorkshire 2, the eight tier of the domestic competition for teams in Yorkshire.

Club honours 
 Yorkshire Shield Winners (2): 1965, 1975
 Yorkshire 4 champions (2): 1988–89, 2007–08
 Yorkshire Silver Trophy Winners: 1989
 Yorkshire 3 champions: 1992–93
 Yorkshire 5 champions: 2014–15

References

External links 

English rugby union teams
Hessle